Anei  is a village in Pindra Tehsil of Varanasi district in the Indian state of Uttar Pradesh. Aneai has its own gram panchayat by the same name as the village. The village is about 38 kilometers South-East of Varanasi city, 276 kilometers South-East of state capital Lucknow and 787 kilometers South-East of the national capital Delhi.

Demography
Aneai has a total population of 2,898 people amongst 394 families. Sex ratio of Aneai is 912 and child sex ratio is 876. Uttar Pradesh state average for both ratios is 912 and 902 respectively .

Transportation
Aneai can be accessed by road and does not have a railway station of its own. Nearest operational airports are Varanasi airport (20 kilometers East) and Allahabad Airports (125 kilometers West).

See also

 Pindra Tehsil
 Pindra (Assembly constituency)

Notes
  All demographic data is based on 2011 Census of India.

References 

Villages in Varanasi district